Priscille Kreto Lagoali (born 8 May 1997), known as Priscille Kreto, is an Ivorian footballer who plays as a forward for Africa Sports d'Abidjan and the Ivory Coast women's national team.

International career
Kreto capped for Ivory Coast at senior level during the 2019 WAFU Zone B Women's Cup.

See also
List of Ivory Coast women's international footballers

References

1997 births
Living people
Footballers from Abidjan
Ivorian women's footballers
Women's association football forwards
Ivory Coast women's international footballers